is an arcade shooter video game released by Taito in 1988 and designed by Fukio Mitsuji, creator of Bubble Bobble.  The player controls a golden metal dragon which flies around, breathing fire at its enemies while collecting power-ups to recharge its fire.  The enemies are robots and tanks.  At the end of each level, the player fights a boss.

It was re-released for the PlayStation 2 as a part of Taito Legends 2 in 2006.

Trivia
In Dariusburst, also from Taito, the boss named Dark Helios changes form and appears to be the metal dragon from Syvalion.

See also
Bubble Bobble
Darius

Notes

References

Sources
Syvalion at KLOV
Syvalion at Arcade History
Syvalion at GameFAQs (SNES version)

1988 video games
Arcade video games
Video games about dragons
Scrolling shooters
X68000 games
Super Nintendo Entertainment System games
Taito games
Toshiba EMI games
Trackball video games
Video games scored by Hayato Matsuo
Video games scored by Yasuhisa Watanabe
Horizontally scrolling shooters
Video games developed in Japan